Melkorkustead was a farm in western Iceland during the Icelandic Commonwealth period. It was the home of Melkorka, mother of the gothi Olaf the Peacock.

The name in Irish could be: Myr Kjartan King of Irland or
mael-Curcaigh or Muirchertach of the Leather Cloaks, King of Aileach
son af Niall Glundubh

References
Magnusson, Magnus and Hermann Palsson, transl. Laxdaela Saga. Penguin Classics, 1969.

External links
 Runeberg

Former populated places in Iceland